Matthew Anthony William Gotrel  (born 1 March 1989) is a British rower.

Rowing career
At the 2014 World Rowing Championships in Bosbaan, Amsterdam he was a member of the gold medal winning eight with Nathaniel Reilly-O'Donnell, Matthew Tarrant, Will Satch, Pete Reed, Paul Bennett, Tom Ransley, Constantine Louloudis and Phelan Hill. The following year this was repeated when he was part of the British team that topped the medal table at the 2015 World Rowing Championships at Lac d'Aiguebelette in France, where he won a gold medal as part of the eight with Louloudis, Reed, Bennett, Moe Sbihi, Alex Gregory, George Nash, Satch and Hill.

He won a gold medal in the men's eight event at the 2016 Summer Olympics.

Awards
Gotrel was appointed Member of the Order of the British Empire (MBE) in the 2017 New Year Honours for services to rowing.

References

External links
 Matt Gotrel at British Rowing
 
 
 

1989 births
Living people
Sportspeople from Leamington Spa
British male rowers
English male rowers
World Rowing Championships medalists for Great Britain
Rowers at the 2016 Summer Olympics
Olympic rowers of Great Britain
Olympic gold medallists for Great Britain
Medalists at the 2016 Summer Olympics
Olympic medalists in rowing
Place of birth missing (living people)
Members of the Order of the British Empire
2021 America's Cup sailors
English male sailors (sport)